is a puzzle video game developed by Alexey Pajitnov for Bullet-Proof Software. An arcade version was manufactured by Video System.

Gameplay

Hatris plays similarly to Pazhitnov's previous Tetris, in that game objects falling from the top of the screen must be arranged in specific patterns to gain points and to keep the play area clear. In Hatris, hats of different styles fall from the top of the screen and accumulate at the bottom. To eliminate hats from the play area, five hats of identical style must be stacked. Different style hats stack differently.

Reception
In Japan, Game Machine listed the arcade version of Hatris on their June 1, 1990 issue as being the eighteenth most-successful table arcade unit of the month.

Entertainment Weekly gave the Game Boy version of Hatris an A and wrote that "There is, after all, a cure for Tetris addiction. It’s Hatris, a habit that's even harder to kick."

References

External links 

 

1990 video games
Alexey Pajitnov games
Arcade video games
Blue Planet Software games
Falling block puzzle games
Game Boy games
Microcabin games
Mobile games
Nintendo Entertainment System games
TurboGrafx-16 games
Video games developed in Japan